The 1928 VFL season was the 32nd season of the Victorian Football League (VFL), the highest level senior Australian rules football competition in Victoria. The season featured twelve clubs, ran from 21 April until 29 September, and comprised an 18-game home-and-away season followed by a finals series featuring the top four clubs.

The premiership was won by the Collingwood Football Club for the seventh time and second time consecutively, after it defeated  by 33 points in the 1928 VFL Grand Final.

Premiership season
In 1928, the VFL competition consisted of twelve teams of 18 on-the-field players each, with no "reserves", although any of the 18 players who had left the playing field for any reason could later resume their place on the field at any time during the match.

Teams played each other in a home-and-away season of 18 rounds; matches 12 to 18 were the "home-and-way reverse" of matches 1 to 7.

Once the 18 round home-and-away season had finished, the 1928 VFL Premiers were determined by the specific format and conventions of the amended "Argus system".

Round 1

|- bgcolor="#CCCCFF"
| Home team
| Home team score
| Away team
| Away team score
| Venue
| Crowd
| Date
|- bgcolor="#FFFFFF"
| 
| 9.13 (67)
| 
| 10.10 (70)
| Glenferrie Oval
| 15,000
| 21 April 1928
|- bgcolor="#FFFFFF"
| 
| 11.6 (72)
| 
| 13.7 (85)
| Windy Hill
| 20,000
| 21 April 1928
|- bgcolor="#FFFFFF"
| 
| 14.15 (99)
| 
| 2.9 (21)
| Punt Road Oval
| 20,000
| 21 April 1928
|- bgcolor="#FFFFFF"
| 
| 14.16 (100)
| 
| 15.9 (99)
| Lake Oval
| 20,000
| 21 April 1928
|- bgcolor="#FFFFFF"
| 
| 8.12 (60)
| 
| 9.12 (66)
| Corio Oval
| 18,000
| 21 April 1928
|- bgcolor="#FFFFFF"
| 
| 11.13 (79)
| 
| 18.9 (117)
| Brunswick Street Oval
| 30,000
| 21 April 1928

Round 2

|- bgcolor="#CCCCFF"
| Home team
| Home team score
| Away team
| Away team score
| Venue
| Crowd
| Date
|- bgcolor="#FFFFFF"
| 
| 14.12 (96)
| 
| 17.15 (117)
| Junction Oval
| 20,000
| 28 April 1928
|- bgcolor="#FFFFFF"
| 
| 14.18 (102)
| 
| 9.13 (67)
| Victoria Park
| 20,000
| 28 April 1928
|- bgcolor="#FFFFFF"
| 
| 13.9 (87)
| 
| 10.6 (66)
| Princes Park
| 40,000
| 28 April 1928
|- bgcolor="#FFFFFF"
| 
| 10.16 (76)
| 
| 8.13 (61)
| Arden Street Oval
| 6,000
| 28 April 1928
|- bgcolor="#FFFFFF"
| 
| 6.11 (47)
| 
| 4.16 (40)
| MCG
| 15,122
| 28 April 1928
|- bgcolor="#FFFFFF"
| 
| 10.9 (69)
| 
| 10.13 (73)
| Western Oval
| 20,000
| 28 April 1928

Round 3

|- bgcolor="#CCCCFF"
| Home team
| Home team score
| Away team
| Away team score
| Venue
| Crowd
| Date
|- bgcolor="#FFFFFF"
| 
| 12.12 (84)
| 
| 17.16 (118)
| Brunswick Street Oval
| 17,000
| 5 May 1928
|- bgcolor="#FFFFFF"
| 
| 12.13 (85)
| 
| 5.11 (41)
| Windy Hill
| 22,000
| 5 May 1928
|- bgcolor="#FFFFFF"
| 
| 11.11 (77)
| 
| 10.15 (75)
| Junction Oval
| 12,000
| 5 May 1928
|- bgcolor="#FFFFFF"
| 
| 10.17 (77)
| 
| 12.9 (81)
| Corio Oval
| 12,500
| 5 May 1928
|- bgcolor="#FFFFFF"
| 
| 5.14 (44)
| 
| 5.12 (42)
| Punt Road Oval
| 36,000
| 5 May 1928
|- bgcolor="#FFFFFF"
| 
| 7.17 (59)
| 
| 14.9 (93)
| Glenferrie Oval
| 14,000
| 5 May 1928

Round 4

|- bgcolor="#CCCCFF"
| Home team
| Home team score
| Away team
| Away team score
| Venue
| Crowd
| Date
|- bgcolor="#FFFFFF"
| 
| 7.13 (55)
| 
| 6.15 (51)
| MCG
| 26,558
| 12 May 1928
|- bgcolor="#FFFFFF"
| 
| 6.11 (47)
| 
| 6.14 (50)
| Windy Hill
| 10,000
| 12 May 1928
|- bgcolor="#FFFFFF"
| 
| 15.22 (112)
| 
| 5.9 (39)
| Victoria Park
| 8,000
| 12 May 1928
|- bgcolor="#FFFFFF"
| 
| 16.24 (120)
| 
| 3.6 (24)
| Princes Park
| 18,000
| 12 May 1928
|- bgcolor="#FFFFFF"
| 
| 10.9 (69)
| 
| 10.10 (70)
| Lake Oval
| 10,000
| 12 May 1928
|- bgcolor="#FFFFFF"
| 
| 11.11 (77)
| 
| 10.4 (64)
| Western Oval
| 12,500
| 12 May 1928

Round 5

|- bgcolor="#CCCCFF"
| Home team
| Home team score
| Away team
| Away team score
| Venue
| Crowd
| Date
|- bgcolor="#FFFFFF"
| 
| 14.17 (101)
| 
| 16.14 (110)
| Glenferrie Oval
| 8,000
| 19 May 1928
|- bgcolor="#FFFFFF"
| 
| 15.15 (105)
| 
| 11.15 (81)
| Corio Oval
| 13,000
| 19 May 1928
|- bgcolor="#FFFFFF"
| 
| 13.22 (100)
| 
| 12.14 (86)
| Punt Road Oval
| 30,000
| 19 May 1928
|- bgcolor="#FFFFFF"
| 
| 11.18 (84)
| 
| 13.17 (95)
| Brunswick Street Oval
| 18,000
| 19 May 1928
|- bgcolor="#FFFFFF"
| 
| 11.8 (74)
| 
| 15.12 (102)
| Junction Oval
| 16,000
| 19 May 1928
|- bgcolor="#FFFFFF"
| 
| 11.15 (81)
| 
| 9.11 (65)
| Arden Street Oval
| 22,000
| 19 May 1928

Round 6

|- bgcolor="#CCCCFF"
| Home team
| Home team score
| Away team
| Away team score
| Venue
| Crowd
| Date
|- bgcolor="#FFFFFF"
| 
| 13.8 (86)
| 
| 11.8 (74)
| MCG
| 16,870
| 26 May 1928
|- bgcolor="#FFFFFF"
| 
| 17.19 (121)
| 
| 7.3 (45)
| Western Oval
| 14,000
| 26 May 1928
|- bgcolor="#FFFFFF"
| 
| 10.8 (68)
| 
| 7.19 (61)
| Windy Hill
| 20,000
| 26 May 1928
|- bgcolor="#FFFFFF"
| 
| 12.12 (84)
| 
| 6.9 (45)
| Victoria Park
| 25,000
| 26 May 1928
|- bgcolor="#FFFFFF"
| 
| 19.8 (122)
| 
| 2.27 (39)
| Corio Oval
| 11,000
| 26 May 1928
|- bgcolor="#FFFFFF"
| 
| 12.10 (82)
| 
| 12.13 (85)
| Lake Oval
| 28,000
| 26 May 1928

Round 7

|- bgcolor="#CCCCFF"
| Home team
| Home team score
| Away team
| Away team score
| Venue
| Crowd
| Date
|- bgcolor="#FFFFFF"
| 
| 17.11 (113)
| 
| 11.11 (77)
| Brunswick Street Oval
| 8,000
| 2 June 1928
|- bgcolor="#FFFFFF"
| 
| 12.12 (84)
| 
| 13.9 (87)
| Princes Park
| 30,000
| 2 June 1928
|- bgcolor="#FFFFFF"
| 
| 5.7 (37)
| 
| 14.16 (100)
| Arden Street Oval
| 9,000
| 2 June 1928
|- bgcolor="#FFFFFF"
| 
| 12.21 (93)
| 
| 13.12 (90)
| Punt Road Oval
| 10,000
| 2 June 1928
|- bgcolor="#FFFFFF"
| 
| 9.17 (71)
| 
| 11.6 (72)
| Junction Oval
| 12,000
| 2 June 1928
|- bgcolor="#FFFFFF"
| 
| 7.15 (57)
| 
| 13.20 (98)
| Glenferrie Oval
| 6,000
| 2 June 1928

Round 8

|- bgcolor="#CCCCFF"
| Home team
| Home team score
| Away team
| Away team score
| Venue
| Crowd
| Date
|- bgcolor="#FFFFFF"
| 
| 15.21 (111)
| 
| 3.9 (27)
| Corio Oval
| 9,500
| 4 June 1928
|- bgcolor="#FFFFFF"
| 
| 18.15 (123)
| 
| 8.13 (61)
| Western Oval
| 17,000
| 4 June 1928
|- bgcolor="#FFFFFF"
| 
| 17.13 (115)
| 
| 19.6 (120)
| Brunswick Street Oval
| 15,000
| 4 June 1928
|- bgcolor="#FFFFFF"
| 
| 10.7 (67)
| 
| 11.10 (76)
| Windy Hill
| 20,000
| 4 June 1928
|- bgcolor="#FFFFFF"
| 
| 9.14 (68)
| 
| 13.7 (85)
| Lake Oval
| 22,000
| 4 June 1928
|- bgcolor="#FFFFFF"
| 
| 10.14 (74)
| 
| 9.10 (64)
| MCG
| 41,402
| 4 June 1928

Round 9

|- bgcolor="#CCCCFF"
| Home team
| Home team score
| Away team
| Away team score
| Venue
| Crowd
| Date
|- bgcolor="#FFFFFF"
| 
| 21.16 (142)
| 
| 9.12 (66)
| Punt Road Oval
| 21,000
| 9 June 1928
|- bgcolor="#FFFFFF"
| 
| 13.14 (92)
| 
| 11.14 (80)
| Victoria Park
| 27,000
| 9 June 1928
|- bgcolor="#FFFFFF"
| 
| 9.7 (61)
| 
| 8.14 (62)
| Princes Park
| 25,000
| 9 June 1928
|- bgcolor="#FFFFFF"
| 
| 14.13 (97)
| 
| 10.6 (66)
| Junction Oval
| 17,000
| 9 June 1928
|- bgcolor="#FFFFFF"
| 
| 10.12 (72)
| 
| 15.16 (106)
| Glenferrie Oval
| 8,000
| 9 June 1928
|- bgcolor="#FFFFFF"
| 
| 9.5 (59)
| 
| 10.10 (70)
| Arden Street Oval
| 13,000
| 9 June 1928

Round 10

|- bgcolor="#CCCCFF"
| Home team
| Home team score
| Away team
| Away team score
| Venue
| Crowd
| Date
|- bgcolor="#FFFFFF"
| 
| 11.11 (77)
| 
| 8.4 (52)
| Corio Oval
| 10,000
| 23 June 1928
|- bgcolor="#FFFFFF"
| 
| 8.13 (61)
| 
| 12.16 (88)
| Brunswick Street Oval
| 18,000
| 23 June 1928
|- bgcolor="#FFFFFF"
| 
| 11.12 (78)
| 
| 13.12 (90)
| Lake Oval
| 17,000
| 23 June 1928
|- bgcolor="#FFFFFF"
| 
| 13.24 (102)
| 
| 11.10 (76)
| Punt Road Oval
| 16,000
| 23 June 1928
|- bgcolor="#FFFFFF"
| 
| 9.10 (64)
| 
| 11.12 (78)
| Western Oval
| 30,000
| 23 June 1928
|- bgcolor="#FFFFFF"
| 
| 9.12 (66)
| 
| 10.18 (78)
| Windy Hill
| 22,000
| 23 June 1928

Round 11

|- bgcolor="#CCCCFF"
| Home team
| Home team score
| Away team
| Away team score
| Venue
| Crowd
| Date
|- bgcolor="#FFFFFF"
| 
| 14.11 (95)
| 
| 15.10 (100)
| Glenferrie Oval
| 6,000
| 30 June 1928
|- bgcolor="#FFFFFF"
| 
| 12.13 (85)
| 
| 8.9 (57)
| Victoria Park
| 16,000
| 30 June 1928
|- bgcolor="#FFFFFF"
| 
| 20.12 (132)
| 
| 15.14 (104)
| Princes Park
| 25,000
| 30 June 1928
|- bgcolor="#FFFFFF"
| 
| 9.11 (65)
| 
| 12.9 (81)
| Junction Oval
| 28,500
| 30 June 1928
|- bgcolor="#FFFFFF"
| 
| 10.8 (68)
| 
| 8.8 (56)
| MCG
| 24,562
| 30 June 1928
|- bgcolor="#FFFFFF"
| 
| 7.14 (56)
| 
| 15.12 (102)
| Arden Street Oval
| 8,000
| 30 June 1928

Round 12

|- bgcolor="#CCCCFF"
| Home team
| Home team score
| Away team
| Away team score
| Venue
| Crowd
| Date
|- bgcolor="#FFFFFF"
| 
| 8.5 (53)
| 
| 12.18 (90)
| Arden Street Oval
| 12,000
| 7 July 1928
|- bgcolor="#FFFFFF"
| 
| 13.13 (91)
| 
| 13.11 (89)
| Western Oval
| 17,000
| 7 July 1928
|- bgcolor="#FFFFFF"
| 
| 9.13 (67)
| 
| 12.6 (78)
| Victoria Park
| 17,000
| 7 July 1928
|- bgcolor="#FFFFFF"
| 
| 12.10 (82)
| 
| 12.14 (86)
| Princes Park
| 25,000
| 7 July 1928
|- bgcolor="#FFFFFF"
| 
| 20.14 (134)
| 
| 12.13 (85)
| Junction Oval
| 19,000
| 7 July 1928
|- bgcolor="#FFFFFF"
| 
| 8.19 (67)
| 
| 12.17 (89)
| MCG
| 18,695
| 7 July 1928

Round 13

|- bgcolor="#CCCCFF"
| Home team
| Home team score
| Away team
| Away team score
| Venue
| Crowd
| Date
|- bgcolor="#FFFFFF"
| 
| 8.17 (65)
| 
| 10.9 (69)
| Glenferrie Oval
| 3,000
| 14 July 1928
|- bgcolor="#FFFFFF"
| 
| 6.15 (51)
| 
| 7.13 (55)
| Corio Oval
| 16,500
| 14 July 1928
|- bgcolor="#FFFFFF"
| 
| 15.14 (104)
| 
| 11.8 (74)
| Windy Hill
| 20,000
| 14 July 1928
|- bgcolor="#FFFFFF"
| 
| 10.10 (70)
| 
| 18.13 (121)
| Lake Oval
| 15,000
| 14 July 1928
|- bgcolor="#FFFFFF"
| 
| 7.12 (54)
| 
| 14.15 (99)
| Brunswick Street Oval
| 18,000
| 14 July 1928
|- bgcolor="#FFFFFF"
| 
| 15.15 (105)
| 
| 11.13 (79)
| Punt Road Oval
| 30,000
| 14 July 1928

Round 14

|- bgcolor="#CCCCFF"
| Home team
| Home team score
| Away team
| Away team score
| Venue
| Crowd
| Date
|- bgcolor="#FFFFFF"
| 
| 11.12 (78)
| 
| 21.11 (137)
| Arden Street Oval
| 11,000
| 28 July 1928
|- bgcolor="#FFFFFF"
| 
| 8.9 (57)
| 
| 8.8 (56)
| Western Oval
| 14,000
| 28 July 1928
|- bgcolor="#FFFFFF"
| 
| 11.15 (81)
| 
| 10.13 (73)
| Victoria Park
| 30,000
| 28 July 1928
|- bgcolor="#FFFFFF"
| 
| 22.17 (149)
| 
| 11.13 (79)
| Princes Park
| 10,000
| 28 July 1928
|- bgcolor="#FFFFFF"
| 
| 18.18 (126)
| 
| 11.13 (79)
| MCG
| 13,562
| 28 July 1928
|- bgcolor="#FFFFFF"
| 
| 11.17 (83)
| 
| 18.11 (119)
| Lake Oval
| 16,000
| 28 July 1928

Round 15

|- bgcolor="#CCCCFF"
| Home team
| Home team score
| Away team
| Away team score
| Venue
| Crowd
| Date
|- bgcolor="#FFFFFF"
| 
| 12.10 (82)
| 
| 11.14 (80)
| Arden Street Oval
| 6,000
| 4 August 1928
|- bgcolor="#FFFFFF"
| 
| 13.12 (90)
| 
| 12.17 (89)
| Brunswick Street Oval
| 12,000
| 4 August 1928
|- bgcolor="#FFFFFF"
| 
| 11.13 (79)
| 
| 7.8 (50)
| Punt Road Oval
| 26,000
| 4 August 1928
|- bgcolor="#FFFFFF"
| 
| 4.14 (38)
| 
| 12.10 (82)
| Corio Oval
| 10,000
| 4 August 1928
|- bgcolor="#FFFFFF"
| 
| 9.9 (63)
| 
| 17.18 (120)
| Glenferrie Oval
| 5,000
| 4 August 1928
|- bgcolor="#FFFFFF"
| 
| 13.15 (93)
| 
| 10.9 (69)
| Junction Oval
| 31,000
| 4 August 1928

Round 16

|- bgcolor="#CCCCFF"
| Home team
| Home team score
| Away team
| Away team score
| Venue
| Crowd
| Date
|- bgcolor="#FFFFFF"
| 
| 8.6 (54)
| 
| 10.17 (77)
| Western Oval
| 18,000
| 11 August 1928
|- bgcolor="#FFFFFF"
| 
| 7.12 (54)
| 
| 8.14 (62)
| Windy Hill
| 18,000
| 11 August 1928
|- bgcolor="#FFFFFF"
| 
| 15.16 (106)
| 
| 6.14 (50)
| Victoria Park
| 25,000
| 11 August 1928
|- bgcolor="#FFFFFF"
| 
| 10.12 (72)
| 
| 6.10 (46)
| Princes Park
| 14,000
| 11 August 1928
|- bgcolor="#FFFFFF"
| 
| 12.16 (88)
| 
| 9.10 (64)
| MCG
| 6,547
| 11 August 1928
|- bgcolor="#FFFFFF"
| 
| 15.14 (104)
| 
| 9.13 (67)
| Lake Oval
| 8,000
| 11 August 1928

Round 17

|- bgcolor="#CCCCFF"
| Home team
| Home team score
| Away team
| Away team score
| Venue
| Crowd
| Date
|- bgcolor="#FFFFFF"
| 
| 16.9 (105)
| 
| 12.9 (81)
| Brunswick Street Oval
| 9,000
| 18 August 1928
|- bgcolor="#FFFFFF"
| 
| 9.20 (74)
| 
| 8.8 (56)
| Princes Park
| 18,500
| 18 August 1928
|- bgcolor="#FFFFFF"
| 
| 12.10 (82)
| 
| 11.15 (81)
| Junction Oval
| 17,000
| 18 August 1928
|- bgcolor="#FFFFFF"
| 
| 8.8 (56)
| 
| 19.9 (123)
| Glenferrie Oval
| 8,500
| 18 August 1928
|- bgcolor="#FFFFFF"
| 
| 22.14 (146)
| 
| 11.11 (77)
| Punt Road Oval
| 30,000
| 18 August 1928
|- bgcolor="#FFFFFF"
| 
| 8.9 (57)
| 
| 8.17 (65)
| Arden Street Oval
| 11,000
| 18 August 1928

Round 18

|- bgcolor="#CCCCFF"
| Home team
| Home team score
| Away team
| Away team score
| Venue
| Crowd
| Date
|- bgcolor="#FFFFFF"
| 
| 18.19 (127)
| 
| 6.4 (40)
| MCG
| 8,609
| 1 September 1928
|- bgcolor="#FFFFFF"
| 
| 9.9 (63)
| 
| 15.21 (111)
| Corio Oval
| 7,000
| 1 September 1928
|- bgcolor="#FFFFFF"
| 
| 9.13 (67)
| 
| 10.10 (70)
| Western Oval
| 14,000
| 1 September 1928
|- bgcolor="#FFFFFF"
| 
| 16.22 (118)
| 
| 9.6 (60)
| Windy Hill
| 10,000
| 1 September 1928
|- bgcolor="#FFFFFF"
| 
| 14.16 (100)
| 
| 13.12 (90)
| Lake Oval
| 8,000
| 1 September 1928
|- bgcolor="#FFFFFF"
| 
| 8.19 (67)
| 
| 12.15 (87)
| Victoria Park
| 30,000
| 1 September 1928

Ladder

Finals

All of the 1928 finals were played at the MCG so the home team in the semi-finals and preliminary final is purely the higher ranked team from the ladder but in the Grand Final the home team was the team that won the preliminary final.

Semi-finals

|- bgcolor="#CCCCFF"
| Home team
| Score
| Away team
| Score
| Venue
| Crowd
| Date
|- bgcolor="#FFFFFF"
| 
| 17.15 (117)
| 
| 9.10 (64)
| MCG
| 66,381
| 8 September
|- bgcolor="#FFFFFF"
| Collingwood
| 9.8 (62)
| 
| 9.8 (62)
| MCG
| 41,423
| 15 September
|- bgcolor="#FFFFFF"
| Collingwood
| 10.8 (68)
| 
| 9.10 (64)
| MCG
| 42,175
| 22 September

Grand final

Collingwood defeated Richmond 13.18 (96) to 9.9 (63), in front of a crowd of 50,026 people. (For an explanation of scoring see Australian rules football).

Awards
 The 1928 VFL Premiership team was Collingwood.
 The VFL's leading goalkicker was Gordon Coventry of Collingwood with 89 goals.
 The winner of the 1928 Brownlow Medal was Ivor Warne-Smith of Melbourne with 8 votes.
 Hawthorn took the "wooden spoon" in 1928.
Carlton 18.18 (126) defeated  14.11 (95) in the final, played as a stand-alone game on Thursday 27 September (Show Day holiday) at the Melbourne Cricket Ground before a crowd of 8,000. Carlton received permanent possession of the seconds premiership trophy, the Rosen Cup, as the first team to win it three times.

Notable events
 In Round 4, Footscray beat Geelong for the first time in its history after 25 winless matches (19 in the VFA for two draws and 17 losses and six in the VFL for six losses) over 14 years of competition (1886, 1888–1896, and 1925–1928).
 "Player Blows Umpire's Whistle. Something never before seen at a football match occurred at [the round 6 match between Hawthorn and Footscray at] Hawthorn on Saturday [26 May 1928]. The field umpire was knocked out when the ball struck him on the face, but a Footscray player dashed down the field with the ball. A Hawthorn player took in the situation at a glance and as the umpire was unable to rise this player rushed to his side, seized his whistle and blew a blast which stopped the play. -- The Herald, 1 June 1928.
 One of the most unusual games was played at Corio Oval in round 6, between Fitzroy and Geelong. The game finished with Fitzroy scoring 2.27 (39): they hit the post five times, and only scored their second goal in time on of the fourth quarter. With 25 more behinds than goals, this remains the least accurate performance from any team by this metric. Geelong, on the other hand, scored 19.8 (122), giving them two fewer scoring shots than the Maroons, but they won by 83 points. As of 2020, this remains the record winning margin for a team with fewer scoring shots than their opponent.
 In the round 7 match between Richmond and Geelong, played under atrocious weather conditions on a slushy, wet Punt Road Oval, Richmond players wore fingerless gloves (mittens) to help them control the slippery football.
 On Saturday 16 June, three separate VFL combined teams played representative matches at three different locations: the first VFL team beat a Combined Ovens and Murray Football League side 16.15 (111) to 15.14 (104) at Wangaratta, Victoria, the second beat a Combined New South Wales Australian Football Association side 26.13 (169) to 14.11 (95) at the Sydney Cricket Ground, and the third drew with a Combined South Australian Football League team 13.10 (88) to 11.22 (88) in Adelaide once an incorrectly attributed behind had been deducted from Victoria's scoreboard score by the goal umpires.
In round 17,  lodged an official protest against the result of its one-point loss against , arguing that Bert Smedley's winning goal was kicked about seven seconds after the final bell had rung. The timekeepers agreed that the goal had been scored after the bell, but the protest was dismissed as league rules specified that the field umpire was the sole judge of the sound of the bell.
 The second semi-final match between Collingwood and Melbourne finished in a draw, the first of eight draws in the history of VFL/AFL finals. A full replay was staged the following week, which was won by Collingwood. The draw meant that Richmond, who had won the first semi-final, endured a second consecutive bye week before the final.

Footnotes

References  
 Hogan, P., The Tigers of Old, The Richmond Football Club, (Richmond), 1996. 
 Rogers, S. & Brown, A., Every Game Ever Played: VFL/AFL Results 1897–1997 (Sixth Edition), Viking Books, (Ringwood), 1998. 
 Ross, J. (ed), 100 Years of Australian Football 1897–1996: The Complete Story of the AFL, All the Big Stories, All the Great Pictures, All the Champions, Every AFL Season Reported, Viking, (Ringwood), 1996.

External links
 1928 Season - AFL Tables

Australian Football League seasons
VFL